BIOS-3 is an experimental closed ecosystem at the Institute of Biophysics in Krasnoyarsk, Russia.

Its construction began in 1965, and was completed in 1972. BIOS-3 consists of a  underground steel structure suitable for up to three persons, and was initially used for developing closed ecological human life-support ecosystems. It was divided into 4 compartments, one of which is a crew area. The crew area consists of 3 single-cabins, a galley, lavatory and control room. Initially one other compartment was an algal cultivator, and the other two 'phytotrons' for growing wheat or vegetables. The plants growing in the two 'phytotrons' contributed approximately 25% of the air filtering in the compound. Later the algal cultivator was converted into a third phytotron. A level of light comparable to sunlight was supplied in each of the 4 compartments by 20 kW xenon lamps, cooled by water jackets. The facility used 400 kW of electricity, supplied by a nearby hydroelectric power station.

Chlorella algae were used to recycle air breathed by humans, absorbing carbon dioxide and replenishing it with oxygen through photosynthesis. The algae were cultivated in stacked tanks under artificial light. To achieve a balance of oxygen and carbon dioxide, one human needed  of exposed Chlorella. Water and nutrients were stored in advance and were also recycled. By 1968, system efficiency had reached 85% by recycling water. Dried meat was imported into the facility, and urine and feces were generally dried and stored, rather than being recycled.

BIOS-3 facilities were used to conduct 10 manned closure experiments with a one to three man crew. The longest experiment with a three-man crew lasted 180 days (in 1972-1973). The facilities were used for the tests at least until 1984. 

In 1986, Dr. Josef Gitelson, head of the Institute of Biophysics (IBP) at Krasnoyarsk and developer of biospherics as well the BIOS project, met with Oleg Gazenko, Mark Nelson, John Allen and others involved with Biosphere 2, which led to further cooperation. In 1989, a group from Biosphere 2 visited BIOS-3 facilities. Mark Nelson and John Allen have acknowledged the importance of BIOS-3 and Russian insights to Biosphere 2.

In 1991, BIOS-3 became a part of the International Center for Closed Ecosystems, which was formed as a subdivision of Institute of Biophysics, Russian Academy of Sciences, Siberian Branch. Closed ecosystems research focusing on growing plants and recycling waste was resumed in 2005 in cooperation with European Space Agency.

See also

References

External links
 
 
 Gitelson, Iosef I., and Genry M. Lisovsky. "Creation of closed ecological life support systems: Results, critical problems and potentials." (2008).
 BIOS-3 facility as a part of the BIOSMHARS (BIOcontamination Specific Modelling in HAbitats Related to Space) project

Controlled ecological life support systems
Ecological experiments
Science and technology in the Soviet Union
Human analog missions